, also known as Chimimoryo: A Soul of Demons, is a 1971 Japanese drama film directed by Kō Nakahira. It was entered into the 1971 Cannes Film Festival.

Cast
 Nobuko Tashiro - Ikezoe's wife
 Ai Sasaki - Kinu
 Toru Emori - Takeda
 Koji Nambara - Karino
 Taiji Tonoyama - Hachizo
 Kazuko Ineno - Kume
 Mariko Kaga - Tokuhime
 Akaji Maro - Kinzo
 Hiroko Ogi - Yuki
 Eiji Okada - Ikezoe

References

External links

1971 films
1971 drama films
Films directed by Kō Nakahira
1970s Japanese-language films
Japanese drama films
1970s Japanese films